Festival of life may refer to:

A celebration/festival of life, a funeral event focusing on one's accomplishments in life
The 1968 Democratic National Convention protest activity, a historical event